David Benjamin Moo (born December 3, 1970) is an American former voice actor. He worked on projects for 4Kids Entertainment, Central Park Media, NYAV Post, and TAJ Productions. Moo is best known for voicing Sanji in the 4Kids English language dub of One Piece, Xellos in Slayers, and Faraji Ngala in several episodes of the 2003–2009 Teenage Mutant Ninja Turtles animated series.

Personal life and career
Moo has Chinese, Jamaican, and Jewish ancestry and was previously an actor and theatre director in the 1990s. He began landing roles as a voice actor in the late 1990s, primarily voicing characters in Japanese anime as they were dubbed into English for local audiences.

Moo has also worked as a bartender, specializing in novelty cocktails since the early 2000s. He enjoys making Manhattans and a drink he calls "Alice's Mallet" made from gin and rhubarb syrup that he distills himself. He was a head bartender at New York City establishments Ouest and Last Exit before opening Quarter Bar with business partner Joe Herron on the southern edge of Park Slope in 2007. In 2016, Esquire magazine named Quarter Bar one of the top 18 bars in the United States. 

In January 2019, Moo appeared as a contestant on the quiz show Jeopardy! (Season 35, Episode 95), coming in second place out of the three contestants and winning $2,000.

Filmography
 Giant Robo - Kael (NYAV Post dub)
 The Gokusen - Sawada's Father
 Ichi the Killer - Episode 0 - Hirano
 Irresponsible Captain Tylor - Yamashita (OVA, Ep. 4)
 Kizuna: Bonds of Love - Masa (credited as Dominic Moore)
 Night on the Galactic Railroad - Wireless Operator
 Now and Then, Here and There - Additional Voices
 One Piece - Sanji (4Kids dub)
 Ping-Pong Club - Hide, Jinpei's Father, Kitazato, Mr. Kida, Tachikawa (credited as Dominic Moore)
 Shootfighter Tekken - Tayama
 Shura no Toki: Age of Chaos - Munefuyu Matajyuro Yagyu, Tenkai Nankoubo
 Silent Service - General Akegaki
 The Slayers - Xellos (Seasons 2 & 3)
 Takegami - Guardian of Darkness - Jiunbo
 Teenage Mutant Ninja Turtles (2003) - Faraji Ngala, Admin Wizard
 Yu-Gi-Oh! - Panik
 Yu-Gi-Oh! GX - Gravekeeper's Chief

References

External links

1970 births
American male voice actors
American people of Chinese descent
Living people
Place of birth missing (living people)